Vera Vladimirovna Serganova is a professor of mathematics at the University of California, Berkeley who researches superalgebras and their representations.

Serganova graduated from Moscow State University. She defended her Ph.D. in 1988 at Saint Petersburg State University under the joint supervision of Dimitry Leites and Arkady Lvovich Onishchik. She was an invited speaker at the International Congress of Mathematicians in 1998 and a plenary speaker at the ICM in 2014.
In 2017, she was elected a member of the American Academy of Arts and Sciences.

The Gelfand–Serganova theorem gives a geometric characterization of Coxeter matroids; it was published by Serganova and Israel Gelfand in 1987 as part of their research originating the concept of a Coxeter matroid.

References

Year of birth missing (living people)
Living people
Russian mathematicians
20th-century American mathematicians
21st-century American mathematicians
American women mathematicians
Saint Petersburg State University alumni
University of California, Berkeley faculty
20th-century women mathematicians
21st-century women mathematicians
20th-century American women
21st-century American women